Mark of the Gorilla is 1950 Jungle Jim film starring Johnny Weissmuller. It was the third in the series.

Plot
Gorilla attacks on humans come as a surprise to Jungle Jim, since the creatures are not known to exist in this part of Africa. On his way to see Frank Bentley, warden of the Nairobi animal preserve, Jim encounters a young woman in distress, Nyobi, and saves her life.

Bentley is ill, being treated by Dr. Brandt, who unknown to all is in league with fortune hunters trying to find a trove of Nazi hidden gold. Barbara Bentley, the warden's niece, goes along with Jim and learns that men are wearing animal costumes, disguising themselves as gorillas and lions, to make deaths appear accidental.

Although all three end up captured, Jim is able to free Barbara and Nyobi and defeat the culprits. Nyobi, revealing she is actually a princess, is permitted to take the gold back to her people.

Cast
 Johnny Weissmuller as Jim
 Trudy Marshall as Barbara
 Suzanne Dalbert as Nyobi
 Onslow Stevens as Dr. Brandt
 Selmer Jackson as Frank Bentley

Production
Filming started September 14, 1949.

References

External links
Mark of the Gorilla at TCMDB

Review of film at Variety

1950 films
Columbia Pictures films
Jungle Jim films
American adventure films
1950 adventure films
American black-and-white films
Films directed by William A. Berke
1950s English-language films
1950s American films